Thioscelis is a moth genus of the family Depressariidae.

Species
 Thioscelis directrix Meyrick, 1909
 Thioscelis fuscata Duckworth, 1967
 Thioscelis geranomorpha Meyrick, 1932
 Thioscelis lipara Duckworth, 1967
 Thioscelis whalleyi Duckworth, 1967

References

 
Stenomatinae